Hoole Village is a former civil parish, now in the parishes of Mickle Trafford and District and Guilden Sutton, in Cheshire West and Chester, England. It contains four buildings that are recorded in the National Heritage List for England as designated listed buildings, all of which are at Grade II. This grade is the lowest of the three gradings given to listed buildings and is applied to "buildings of national importance and special interest". The parish is located to the northeast of Chester, and contains only one substantial structure, Hoole Hall. This is a listed building, together with two associated structures. The only other listed building is a pinfold.

See also
Listed buildings in Chester
Listed buildings in Christleton
Listed buildings in Great Boughton
Listed buildings in Guilden Sutton

Listed buildings in Mickle Trafford
Listed buildings in Upton-by-Chester

References
Citations

Sources

Listed buildings in Cheshire West and Chester
Lists of listed buildings in Cheshire